Pfeiffer Lake is an unorganized territory in Saint Louis County, Minnesota, United States. The 2000 census population was three.

Geography
According to the United States Census Bureau, the unorganized territory has a total area of 36.3 square miles (94.1 km2); 36.2 square miles (93.7 km2) is land and 0.2 square mile (0.4 km2) (0.47%) is water.

Demographics
As of the census of 2000, there were three people, two households, and one family residing in the unorganized territory. The population density was 0.1 people per square mile (0/km2). There were thirteen housing units at an average density of 0.4/sq mi (0.1/km2).

The median income for a household in the unorganized territory was $13,750, and the per capita income for the unorganized territory was $14,033.

References

Populated places in St. Louis County, Minnesota
Unorganized territories in Minnesota